Daniel Fasquelle (born 16 January 1963) is a French politician of The Republicans (LR) who has been serving as a member of the National Assembly of France from 2007 to 2020, representing the Pas-de-Calais department.

Political career
In parliament, Fasquelle has been serving on the Committee on Economic Affairs since 2009.

In the Republicans’ 2016 presidential primaries, Fasquelle endorsed Nicolas Sarkozy as the party's candidate for the office of President of France.

On 26 August 2017, Fasquelle declared himself a candidate in the leadership election for the presidency of The Republicans, but was deemed to have secured an insufficient number of sponsorships on 26 October and therefore considered ineligible.

Following Christian Jacob's election as LR chairman, Fasquelle announced his candidacy to succeed him as leader of the party's parliamentary group. In an internal vote in November 2019, he eventually came in fourth out of six candidates; the position went to Damien Abad instead.

At the Republicans’ national convention in December 2021, Fasquelle was part of the 11-member committee which oversaw the party’s selection of its candidate for the 2022 presidential elections.

References

External links 
  Daniel Fasquelle at the National Assembly of France

1963 births
Living people
People from Saint-Omer
Paris 2 Panthéon-Assas University alumni
The Republicans (France) politicians
Mayors of places in Hauts-de-France
Deputies of the 13th National Assembly of the French Fifth Republic
Deputies of the 14th National Assembly of the French Fifth Republic
Deputies of the 15th National Assembly of the French Fifth Republic
Members of Parliament for Pas-de-Calais
Members of the Regional Council of Hauts-de-France